John Cooney may refer to:

 Johnny Cooney (1901–1986), American baseball player
 John Cooney (politician) (1836–1894), American lawyer and politician from New York
 John Cooney (rugby union) (born 1990), Irish rugby union player
 John Cooney (video game developer), American game designer from Sacramento